"Fool, Fool, Fool" is a 1951 song by The Clovers.  The single was their second number one on the R&B chart and their most successful song on that chart, spending six weeks at the number-one position.

References

1951 singles
The Clovers songs
1951 songs
Songs written by Ahmet Ertegun